Pro-Beijing camp, pro-establishment camp or pro-China camp ( or ; ,  or ) is a segment of Macau society which supports the policies and views of China and Chinese Communist Party before and after the handover of Macau on 20 December 1999. The term can be used to identify politicians, political parties and individuals. Their rivals are the pro-democracy camp.

History

Prior to handover
Some of the political groups within the pro-establishment camp, such as the Union for Development and Progress Promotion Union have had a long history of following the directions of the People's Republic of China and of loyalty to the Chinese Communist Party since the colonial period.

Policies
Pro-establishment members are united by the political ideology or economic policies of being closer to Beijing, as much out of pragmatism as of conviction, but vary on other issues within the context of Macau.

Members of the camp
Civil organisations, individual social activists, political parties, political groups and lawmakers who share a similar belief in democracy are all considered members of this camp. (number of Legislative Deputies shown in brackets)

The following entities are routinely referred to as members of the Pro-establishment camp:

 Pro-business
 Macau Business Interest Union (4)
 Macau professional Interest Union (2)
 Excellent Culture and Sports Union Association (2)
 Macau United Citizens Association (2)
 New Union for Macau's Development (1)
 Macau-Guangdong Union (1)
 Alliance for Change (1)
 Macau Chinese Chamber of Commerce
 Traditionalists 
 Employees Association Joint Candidature Commission (2)
 Macau Federation of Trade Unions and Union for Development (2)
 General Union of Neighbourhood Associations of Macau and Progress Promotion Union (1)

Electoral performance

Legislative Council elections

See also
 PRC United Front strategy
 Pro-Beijing camp (Hong Kong)
 List of political parties and political groups in Macau

References

Political party alliances in China
Politics of Macau
Conservatism in Asia